The term Orthodox Christianity in Syria may refer to:

 Eastern Orthodox Christianity in Syria, relating to communities and institutions of Eastern Orthodox Church, in Syria
 Oriental Orthodox Christianity in Syria, relating to communities and institutions of Oriental Orthodox Church, in Syria

See also
 Orthodox Christianity (disambiguation)
 Syria (disambiguation)